PlayStation 3 Jailbreak was the first USB (Universal Serial Bus) chipset that allowed unauthorized execution of code, similar to homebrew, on the PlayStation 3. It works by bypassing a system security check using a memory exploit (heap overflow) which occurs with USB devices that allows the execution of unsigned code.

Present and future support
In August 2011, information about hardware that was downgrading PlayStations on system software v3.70 was being released.

Legality
Sony had taken a few steps to prevent the jailbreak of the PlayStation 3, and has associated the action as a form of copyright infringement. In eastern European countries, no action has ever been taken to condemn such cases. 

The cases listed below are lawsuits Sony filed in courts to prohibit the sales and imports of circumvention devices that would jailbreak the system.
PS3 Jailbreak was outlawed in Australia as it was considered to be in violation of copyright law. The ban states that PS Jailbreak cannot be imported, distributed to another person or offered to the public.
Sony lost a lawsuit in December 2010 in Barcelona against the seller of PS Jailbreak. The sales and imports of the product were therefore deemed legal to use within Spain, and Sony were ordered to pay damages for trying to block the sales and imports.
In January 2011, Sony had filed a lawsuit against George Hotz for leaking the encryption keys for the PlayStation 3. The case was settled in April of that year, where Hotz agreed to a permanent injunction to never circumvent a Sony product again. The Court had also approved that Sony's lawyers could obtain the IP addresses of anyone who visited Hotz's website.

See also

 PlayStation 3 homebrew
 Game backup device
 Modchip
 Privilege escalation
 George Hotz
 PlayStation 3 system software

References

Hardware restrictions
Jailbreak
Video game hardware